Romeo Rivera (born September 27, 1946) is a Filipino actor. He appeared in more than 95 movies and television shows.

Career
In 1963, Sampaguita Pictures introduced him with a bunch of young teenage stars which they called the Sampaguita-Vera-Perez All Stars: Rosemarie Sonora, Blanca Gomez, Gina Pareño, Lito Legaspi, Dindo Fernando, and Pepito Rodriguez, among others. The movies they made were Mga Batang Artista (1964), Mga Batang Bakasyonista (1964), Mga Batang Iskwater (1964), and Mga Batang Turista (1965), among others.

He received a nomination for FAMAS Award Best Supporting Actor 1966 in Paalam sa Kahapon.

He played as Mr. Crisford in 1995 family-drama film Sarah... Ang Munting Prinsesa starring Camille Prats as well as Pontius Pilate in Kristo in 1996.

Filmography

Film

Warat (1999)
Bobby Barbers: Parak (1997)
Maalaala Mo Kaya - "Dancing Shoes I" (1994)
Kapantay Ay Langit (1994)
Maging Sino Ka Man (1991)
Paano Kung Wala Ka Na? (1987)
Nakagapos Na Puso (1986)
Macho Gigolo (1986)
Kailan Sasabihing Mahal Kita? (1985)
Pati Ba Pintig ng Puso? (1985)
Ulo ng Gapo (1985)
Sa Hirap at Ginhawa (1984)
Baby Tsina (1984)
Erap Is My Guy (1973)

Television

Wansapanataym (1999)
Maalaala Mo Kaya - "Lobo" (2001)
Kay Tagal Kang Hinintay (2002-2003)
Magpakailanman - "The Manny & Pie Calayan Story" (2005)

References

External links

1939 births
Living people
20th-century Filipino male actors
21st-century Filipino male actors